George Chalmers may refer to:

George Chalmers (artist) (died 1791), Scottish artist
George Chalmers (antiquarian) (1742–1825), Scottish antiquarian and political writer
George Paul Chalmers (1833–1878), Scottish painter
George Chalmers (baseball) (1888–1960), Major League baseball player
George Edward Chalmer Hayes (1894–1968), American lawyer
George V. Chalmers (1907–1984), American college athlete
George Everett Chalmers (1905–1993), Canadian doctor, surgeon and political figure